Azteca is the Spanish word for Aztec. In English, Azteca or Aztecas may refer to:

Animals
 Azteca (ant), a genus of ants
 Azteca horse, a breed of horse

Games
 Azteca, a world in the online game of Wizard101

Sport
 Aztecas de la UDLAP, the representative teams of Universidad de las Américas Puebla, Mexico
 Adidas Azteca, the official match ball of 1986 FIFA World Cup in Mexico
 Estadio Azteca, a Mexican sports stadium

Transport
 Líneas Aéreas Azteca, a Mexican airline
 Metro Ciudad Azteca, a Mexican train station
 Azteca, an automobile made by Fiberfab

Media
 Azteca, a character in the 1998 DreamWorks Animation animated film Antz
 TV Azteca, a Mexican mass media company
 Azteca América, Azteca's Spanish-language American broadcast network
 Azteca Now (azteca Now), Spanish-language free-video streaming service owned by TV Azteca 
 Azteca Productions, an American independent comic book publisher

Music
 Azteca (band), an American Latin rock/jazz fusion group
 Azteca Records (California), a record label specializing in Mexican music

See also
 Aztec (disambiguation)